Freiha is a small deserted village on the north western coast of the Qatar Peninsula in the Al Shamal municipality. It is located in the Zubarah region being 3 km north of Zubarah town, and was founded by the Al Bin Ali tribe , main and principal Utub tribe in the first half of the eighteenth century along with the historical town of Zubarah.

The age and origin of the settlement is unknown, however excavations and historical documents suggest that it was at its peak in the 17th–18th century, almost certainly pre-dating its larger neighbour Al Zubarah. The village covers an area of approximately 50 hectares, extending for 700m north to south along the coast and approximately 200m east to west inland. It is sited around a shallow bay.

Etymology
The name Freiha comes from the Arabic word 'Faraihah', which means 'joy'.

History

The Al Bin Ali, migrated from Kuwait and settled at Freiha and Zubarah in 1732,  founded and ruled these historical towns.

The Al Bin Ali were the original dominant group controlling the Zubarah region including Freiha on the Qatar peninsula, they were a politically important group that moved backwards and forwards between Qatar and Bahrain, originally the center of power of the Bani Utbah. The Al Bin Ali they were also known for their courage, persistence, and abundant wealth.

In J.G. Lorimer's Gazetteer of the Persian Gulf published in 1904, Freiha was described as a place 3 miles south of Al Khuwayr which had a few trading boats and approximately 150 inhabitants, most of whom were fishermen.

Freiha was among the villages occupied by Abdullah bin Jassim Al Thani's forces in July 1937 during his military expedition against the Naim tribe and its supporters, whom he considered to be defectors to Bahrain.

Archaeology 

The site was subjected to investigations by Qatari archaeologists in the 2005. More recently in 2009, the QMA, jointly with the University of Copenhagen, launched the Qatar Islamic Archaeology and Heritage Project (QIAH), a ten-year research, conservation and heritage initiative, to investigate sites in the Al Zubarah hinterland. The project is an initiative by the Qatar Museums Authority's Chairperson Sheikha Al-Mayassa bint Hamad bin Khalifa Al-Thani and Vice-Chairperson Sheikh Hassan bin Mohamed bin Ali Al Thani. The QIAH project has carried out a complete topographic survey of the site of Freiha, allowing a map to be produced. This has led to a new series of excavations on the site, targeted at a central mosque, several domestic structures, and middens (rubbish dumps) surrounding the settlement.

Qal’at Freiha 

One of the main features of the site is the partially excavated and conserved Qal’at Freiha, a high fortified building measuring approximately 45m square, with evidence of corner towers in the Islamic style, excavated and conserved in 2005. Inside the fort a variety of domestic structures were found, including store rooms and date presses (madbassat).

Mosque 

Close to the centre of the settlement, and the fort, the village's second largest structure has been excavated. The architecture and alignment suggests that this building was a mosque. Elements such as a mihrab, minbar, a well for washing, and an open courtyard all mirror closely other later Qatari mosques.

Domestic architecture 

The domestic structures of Freiha appear typical of the Persian Gulf region and the time period. They consist of small stone built rooms, frequently with small open courtyards attached to them. Where excavations have been carried out, these structures appear to undergo constant remodelling throughout their lifespan, often with small rooms and sub divisions being added. Finds evidence in the form of stone fishing weights, large amounts of fish bones and the presence of extensive tidal fish traps suggests a primarily marine based economy. It seems likely from archaeological evidence, that the first occupation of the site was in temporary structures, and shelters prior to more permanent, mud and then stone dwellings being built.

Rock art 
In 1956, Geoffrey Bibby and Peter Glob discovered several hundred cup-marks carved in rock in Freiha. The sizes range from 5 to 23 cm and have a depth of 2 to 10 cm, with most being 5 cm in diameter and having a depth of 1 to 3 cm. Bibby and Glob noted that the cup-marks are similar to those found in Bahrain dating to the Dilmun period. Several hand and footprints were also documented in Freiha.

Geometrical designs were recorded at Freiha in four places. They measure 11 to 15 cm in width and 11 to 12 cm in height. Peter Glob believed that they were carved by an ancient fertility cult. This theory was disputed by archaeologist Muhammad Abdul Nayeem, who believes that they are abstract symbols or tribal marks.

Danish archaeologist Hans Kapel recorded a total of 303 rock carvings at Freiha during his 1983 survey of Qatar.

Gallery

References

External links 
Rees, G.; Walmsley, A. G.; Richter, T. (2011). "Investigations in the Zubarah Hinterland at Murayr and Furayhah, North-West Qatar". Proceedings of the Seminar for Arabian Studies 41: 309–316.
Richter, T., ed. (2010). Qatar Islamic Archaeology and Heritage Project. End of Season Report. Stage 2, Season 1, 2009-2010. University of Copenhagen/Qatar Museums Authority.
Richter, T.; Wordsworth, P. D.; Walmsley, A. G. (2011). "Pearlfishers, townsfolk, Bedouin and Shaykhs: economic and social relations in Islamic Al-Zubarah". Proceedings of the Seminar for Arabian Studies 41: 1–16.
Walmsley, A.; Barnes, H.; Macumber, P. (2010). "Al-Zubarah and its hinterland, north Qatar: excavations and survey, spring 2009". Proceedings of the Seminar for Arabian Studies 40: 55–68.

Archaeological sites in Qatar
Al Shamal